Oil Region Astronomical Observatory is an astronomical observatory owned and operated by Oil Region Astronomical Society. The Oil Region Astronomical Society was founded in 1993. It is located in Venango County,  Pennsylvania (USA).

See also 
List of astronomical observatories

References

External links
Oil Region Astronomical Society Observatory Clear Sky Clock

Astronomical observatories in Pennsylvania
Buildings and structures in Venango County, Pennsylvania